D'Artagnan Athos Martin (born March 28, 1949) is a former American football defensive back who played one season with the New Orleans Saints of the National Football League. He was drafted by the New Orleans Saints in the fourth round of the 1971 NFL Draft. He played college football at Kentucky State University and attended Carver High School in New Orleans, Louisiana.

References

External links
Just Sports Stats

Living people
1949 births
Players of American football from New Orleans
American football defensive backs
African-American players of American football
Kentucky State Thorobreds football players
New Orleans Saints players
21st-century African-American people
20th-century African-American sportspeople